Barbie: Star Light Adventure is a 2016 computer-animated adventure children's film directed by Andrew Tan and written by Kacey Arnold with assistance by Kate Boutilier and story supervision by Kristopher Fogel.

The 33rd entry in the Barbie film series, it was also the first Barbie film under Mattel's then-new division, Mattel Creations, and also to feature the fashion doll's brand message sequence as part of the film's intro. The film was first given a 24-hour limited theatrical release by Fathom Events on 30 July before its debut both on home video by Universal Pictures Home Entertainment on 29 August and on American television via Nickelodeon on 2 October. Mattel released related merchandise in addition to the film.

Plot
The narrator explains that a prophecy has foretold that someday the stars will cease their cosmic dance and go out, unless "The One" can start them glowing again and restore order to the galaxy. This prophecy is starting to come true, and the sky is getting darker. The rigidly organized and disciplined King Constantine, who still believes despite many failures that he must be "The One", hatches his latest plan for proving himself and starts recruiting young people to help.

On the distant wildlife preserve planet of Para-Den, Barbie is an enthusiastic if impetuous Hoverboarder, who also has the ability to communicate with animals and objects using telekinetic powers. She is afraid to accept Constantine's invitation, but her widowed father convinces her to try, and she travels to the Capital Planet.

At a great ball, King Constantine introduces Barbie to the rest of the team he has assembled – Sal-Lee, a sarcastic and competitive Hoverboarder who is also a speedster; the socially awkward and naïve Prince Leo who is the best pilot in the galaxy; and the kindhearted alien sisters Kareena and Sheena, who have a psychic connection and also possess the ability to manipulate gravity to make things lighter or heavier, respectively. Sal-Lee forces Leo to attempt to dance a waltz at the ball and he is humiliated – Barbie sympathetically starts a rave so he can dance his own way, but Constantine sees it as disorderly and puts a stop to it. Later, Barbie and Sal-Lee stay up past curfew and start to bond over a shared loneliness and fear of losing the rest of the stars.

Constantine explains his plan to discover the center of the galaxy and use a machine to zap the stars into order. He then sends Barbie and Sal-Lee on a hoverboard race through a course designed to see which is better able to take the twins through the gravity-related obstacles, but when Barbie spots danger, she convinces the twins and Sal-Lee to work together with her, also using her powers to save Sal-Lee from falling debris. Constantine is impressed, but also worried that Barbie keeps defying his orders. When she stays up past curfew again to help a distressed animal, he lectures her on the importance of following a plan in an emergency.

Things come to a head when he sends the group on a mission to capture a Starlian creature as part of their training. They succeed through dance, but Barbie senses the creature's terror and distress and convinces the others to let it go, thinking Constantine wants it in a zoo. Constantine, furious at being both disobeyed and misjudged, fires Barbie on the spot; he needed the Starlian to navigate to the center of the Galaxy to save the stars. Barbie apologizes, but not for doing what she thought was right, and uses her telekinesis to summon the Starlian and ask it nicely for help. Constantine reluctantly bows under the pressure of her teammates to reinstate her, now as their leader.

Constantine and the team set off to the center of the Galaxy, guided and protected by the Starlian. Leo pilots them skillfully to the central planet. Once there, Barbie, Sal-Lee, Sheena, and Kareena fly through the gravity-related obstacles and clear a path for Constantine and his machine. They find their way to the planet's core where the avatars of the stars reside, and Constantine, stubbornly disregarding Barbie's advice to listen and reevaluate the situation, uses his device as planned. All the stars, forced into rigid order, instantly go out. Barbie, who could sense the stars were ceasing their dance out of sadness and loneliness, starts a new dance with them to cheer them up, and restores their order and light to the Galaxy, proving herself "the One".

On the way home, Constantine humbly tells Barbie that while their personalities are irrevocably different, the two of them should stop working against each other and begin to learn from each other. He takes her and her father in as his wards, and the film ends with Barbie, now as Princess Starlight, and her friends teaching Constantine how to dance at a rave.

Cast
 Erica Lindbeck as Barbie (Princess Starlight)
 Robbie Daymond as Prince Leo
 Kimberly Woods as Sal-Lee
 Sarah Anne Williams as Sheena / Kareena / Sprites
 Michael Chandler as Barbie's Dad
 Dwight Schultz as King Constantine
 Lucien Dodge as Pupcorn
 Laura Post as Narrator
 Ben Bledsoe as Artemis
 Jonathan Lipow as Starlian

References

External links
 at Universal Pictures Home Entertainment portal
 

2016 films
Barbie films
2010s American films
2010s Canadian films
2010s English-language films
2010s American animated films
Canadian direct-to-video films
Universal Pictures direct-to-video films
Universal Pictures direct-to-video animated films
2016 direct-to-video films
American direct-to-video films
Canadian animated feature films
Films scored by Toby Chu
Films set in outer space
Films set on fictional planets